276P/Vorobjov (previously P/2012 T7 (Vorobjov)) is a Jupiter-family comet discovered on 15 October 2012 by Tomáš Vorobjov on three 120-s images taken remotely using the 0.81-m f/7 Ritchey-Chretien Schulman Telescope located at the Mt. Lemmon SkyCenter via the Sierra Stars Observatory Network in the course of a minor-planet search survey undertaken as part of the International Astronomical Search Collaboration (IASC) school campaigns. After posting on the Minor Planet Center's NEOCP webpage, other observers have commented on the object's cometary appearance. The discovery was announced by the Minor Planet Center on 18 October, three days after the discovery.

Prediscovery 

On December 29, 2012, Robert Matson (Newport Coast, CA, USA) has identified NEAT observations of this comet obtained with the Palomar 1.2m Schmidt telescope on December 19, 2000 and January 20, 2001, and G. V. Williams (MPC) has confirmed the identity; Williams then identified prediscovery observations acquired by A. Boattini at Mount Lemmon (G96) on 2011 Nov 1. in incidental astrometry sent to the Minor Planet Center, when the object's magnitude was measured as being 21.1-21.8.

Confirmation 

A confirmation set of images were taken by R. Holmes the following night with a 0.61-m f/4 astrograph from Westfield, IL (H21) and showed a 6″ coma and a tail 25″ long in PA 260°. Due to its cometary appearance, the object was posted on the NEO Confirmation Page under the temporary designation TOV7DD.

Gallery

References

External links 
MPEC 2012-U40 : COMET P/2012 T7 (VOROBJOV)
Orbital simulation from JPL (Java) / Horizons Ephemeris
Elements and Ephemeris for 276P/Vorobjov – Minor Planet Center

Periodic comets
0276
20121015